Good News is a studio album by American country artist, Kathy Mattea. It was released on September 21, 1993, via Mercury Records and the PolyGram label. It was the eighth studio album of Mattea's career and her first collection of Christmas music. The project featured mostly new recordings that embedded gospel music sounds. Good News made the American country albums chart in 1993 and received an accolade from the Grammy Awards in 1994. Critics and writers remarked positively of the album and highlighted its uniqueness as compared to other Christmas album projects.

Background, recording and content
By 1993, Kathy Mattea had reached peak success in her country music career. She had four number one singles and several more that placed in the top 20 of the North American country charts. She also won top honors from the Country Music Association and received the Grammy Award for Best Female Country Vocal Performance for 1989's "Where've You Been". In 1993, she released her first album of Christmas music titled Good News.

The album was recorded at two separate studios: Creative Recording and Jack's Tracks. It was produced mostly by Brent Maher, with one track produced by Allen Reynolds. The album was a collection of ten tracks, most of which were original material. The album's second track, "There's a New Kid in Town", was a song first recorded by Keith Whitley that Mattea found several years prior. "It's just so sweet, and it really got me musically from the beginning," she told the Chicago Tribune. There were also some covers featured on the album such as "Brightest and Best", "Mary, Did You Know?" "Christ's Child's Lullabye". According to the Chicago Tribune, it was the only Christmas carol composed in the Gaelic language of Ireland. The album's title track was written by pop musician, Rob Mathes.

Release, chart performance and reception

Good News was released on September 21, 1993, on the Mercury and PolyGram labels. It was the eighth studio album in Mattea's career and first of Christmas music. It was originally offered as both a compact disc and as a cassette. In the 2000s and 2010s it was released to digital sites. Good News entered the American Billboard Top Country Albums chart on December 18, 1993. It spent four weeks there, peaking at the number 51 position on January 1, 1994. It also spent one week on the Billboard Top Christian Albums chart, peaking at number 26 in 1995. It is Mattea's only album to reach the Christian chart to date.

In 1994, Good News won the Best Southern, Country or Bluegrass Gospel Album at the Grammy Awards. It was Mattea's second Grammy win in her career and her last to date. Also in 1994, Mattea embarked on her first Christmas tour based on the album's success.

Good News has received a positive reception from writers and critics. Thom Jurek rated the album four out of five stars, commenting that it was "unlike any country Christmas record ever released". He highlighted the unique song choices and "strange instruments" found on the project. He also found the production to be unique. "This doesn't feel like any Christmas record you've ever heard before, either. It sounds like a well-crafted, gorgeously wrought folk/country/Celtic-flavored Kathy Mattea record," he commented.

Track listing

Personnel
All credits are adapted from the liner notes of Good News and AllMusic.

Musical personnel

Phoebe Binkley - choir
Robert Binkley - choir
Rebecca Blackwell - choir
Lori Brooks - choir
Bob Burns - upright bass
Gary Burr - background vocals
Eric Darken - percussion
Diane Foust - choir
Vicki Hampton - background vocals
Jim Horn - recorder
Chris Leuzinger - electric guitar
Dougie MacLean - acoustic guitar, background vocals
Kenny Malone - drums
Kathy Mattea - lead vocals, background vocals

Randy McCormick - keyboards, piano
Donna McElroy - background vocals
Farrell Morris - marimba, percussion
Gordon Mote - choir
Kimberly Mote - choir
Duncan Mullins - bass guitar
Don Potter - acoustic guitar
Marcus Rowe - choir
Catherine Styron - piano
George Teren - choir
John Thompson - background vocals
Lonnie Wilson - drums
Jonathan Yeaworth - choir

Technical personnel
 Brent Maher - producer (tracks 1–8; 10)
 Allen Reynolds - producer (track 9)

Charts

Accolades

!
|-
| 1994
| 36th Annual Grammy Awards
| Best Southern, Country or Bluegrass Gospel Album 
| 
| 
|-
|}

Release history

References

1993 Christmas albums
Albums produced by Brent Maher
Albums produced by Allen Reynolds
Christmas albums by American artists
Country Christmas albums
Kathy Mattea albums
Mercury Records albums